Whittington Hall is a country house located to the west of the village of Whittington, Lancashire, England, some 3 km (2 miles) south of Kirkby Lonsdale.  The house is recorded in the National Heritage List for England as a designated Grade II* listed building.

It is constructed in sandstone rubble, with a slate roof, and is in Jacobethan style. The building incorporates a battlemented tower with an octagonal corner turret.

History
It was built between 1831 and 1836 on the site of an earlier house to a design by George Webster for Thomas Greene, M.P. On Greenes death in 1872 it passed to his eldest son, Army Officer Dawson Cornelius Greene (1822–87), who retired to live in London and was succeeded by his son, Henry Dawson Dawson-Greene.

In 1887 the Lancaster architects Paley and Austin arranged alterations, including a billiard room, another staircase, and a garden loggia.  The drawing room and dining room were remodelled in Georgian style in the 1930s.

Henry died in 1912 at Whittington leaving two daughters, Mary Sybil and Violet Margaret (died 1988) (who married Thomas Anson, 4th Earl of Lichfield). His son Charles was killed in the First World War.

See also

Grade II* listed buildings in Lancashire
Listed buildings in Whittington, Lancashire
List of works by George Webster
List of non-ecclesiastical works by Paley and Austin

References

Grade II* listed buildings in Lancashire
Grade II* listed houses
Country houses in Lancashire
Houses completed in 1836
Paley and Austin buildings
George Webster buildings
Buildings and structures in the City of Lancaster